Norwegian Reward is a loyalty program operated by Norwegian Air Shuttle.
The program launched in 2007 and has over 10 million members (2019).

In 2017, 2018, 2019 and 2020, Norwegian Reward won the Freddie Award for 'Best Loyalty Program in Europe / Africa' in the airline category. The program also won 'Best Redemption Ability' at the Frequent Traveler Awards in 2019. In 2020, the program also won - 'Best Promotion – Europe & Africa', 'Best Customer Service – Europe & Africa' and 'Best Affinity Credit Card – Europe & Africa' at the Freddie Awards.

References

External links
 Norwegian Reward

Frequent flyer programs
Norwegian Air Shuttle